Marine Brenier (born 11 August 1986) is a French politician who served as a member of the French National Assembly from 2016 to 2022, representing the department of Alpes-Maritimes. She is a member of two political center-right parties, Horizons and La France Audacieuse.

Political career
Brenier joined the UMP in 2007. 

From 2015 to 2017, Brenier served as president of the Young Republicans, succeeding Stéphane Tiki. 

In parliament, Brenier served on the Committee on Sustainable Development and Spatial Planning (2016–2017) and the Committee on Social Affairs (2017–2022).

From 2018 to 2022, Brenier was a member of Soyons libres (SL), founded and led by Valérie Pécresse. In 2021, she led a group of LR deputies pushing for more liberal rules on assisted suicide.  

Brenier was a candidate in the 2022 legislative elections. Her candidacy was endorsed by Nicolas Sarkozy.

See also
 2017 French legislative election

References

1986 births
Living people
Deputies of the 15th National Assembly of the French Fifth Republic
The Republicans (France) politicians
People from Nice
Women members of the National Assembly (France)
21st-century French women politicians
Politicians from Provence-Alpes-Côte d'Azur